Isla de Luzon is Spanish for "Island of Luzon", ad may refer to:

The island of Luzon in the Philippines.
Isla de Luzon, a Spanish Navy second-class protected cruiser that fought in the Battle of Manila Bay during the Spanish–American War.
USS Isla de Luzon, a U.S. Navy gunboat.